Hollywood Cavalcade is a 1939 American film featuring Alice Faye as a young performer making her way in the early days of Hollywood, from slapstick silent pictures through the transition from silent to sound.

Production
In the wake of Alice Faye's 1938 success Alexander's Ragtime Band, which took a nostalgic look at the musical scene of the 1910s, screenwriter Lou Breslow approached studio chief Darryl F. Zanuck with an idea to do another period piece, this time in Technicolor, concerning the early days of silent movies. The film was directed by Irving Cummings, with comedy sequences directed by Mal St. Clair. St. Clair's old crony Buster Keaton staged some of the gags, and a host of silent-era comedians re-created slapstick sight gags. The romance in the storyline was based on the real-life relationship between pioneer producer Mack Sennett and his first star, Mabel Normand.

Atypical for Faye's 20th Century-Fox output, Hollywood Cavalcade has no musical numbers, and the tone is more dramatic than comic. (The working title was Falling Stars.)  The film presents a fictionalized look at silent-era performers and their productions, and ends just after the silent-film industry converts to sound films.

Plot

In 1913, movie director Michael Linnett Connors (Don Ameche), chooses Broadway ingenue Molly Adair (Alice Faye) to be in his next film. He makes her a major star in slapstick comedies. Although she is in love with him, she can't understand his preoccupation with the picture business, and wrongly thinks that Connors regards her only in terms of movies. When she marries her co-star Nicky Hayden (Alan Curtis), Connors misunderstands her and fires her. The disillusioned director's career quickly declines, but his ice-cold demeanor changes when he sees the first talking feature film. Inspired, he approaches Molly and eagerly plans her first sound film.

Cast

 Alice Faye as Molly Adair Hayden
 Don Ameche as Mike Connors
 J. Edward Bromberg as Dave Spingold
 Alan Curtis as Nicky Hayden
 Stuart Erwin as Pete Tinney, Mike's cameraman
 Jed Prouty as Keystone Cop Police Chief
 Buster Keaton as himself
 Donald Meek as Lyle P. Stout, producer
 George Givot as Claude, Molly's suitor opposite Keaton
 Al Jolson as himself 
 Eddie Collins as Keystone Cop
 Russell Hicks as Roberts, film executive
 Hank Mann as Keystone Cop
 Heinie Conklin as Keystone Cop
 James Finlayson as Keystone Cop
 Chick Chandler as Chick, Mike's assistant director 
 Snub Pollard as Keystone Cop 
 Robert Lowery as Henry Potter
 Ben Welden as Agent
 Willie Fung as Willie
 Paul Stanton as Filson
 Mary Forbes as Mrs. Gaynes
 Joseph Crehan as Attorney
 Irving Bacon as Clerk
 Ben Turpin as Bartender in Western 
 Chester Conklin as Sheriff in Western
 Marjorie Beebe as Telephone Operator
 Frederick Burton as Thomas
 Lee Duncan  as Lee Duncan, the Dog Trainer
 Rin Tin Tin Jr. as Rin-Tin-Tin
 Mack Sennett as himself

References

External links

Turner Classic Movies page

1939 films
Films about Hollywood, Los Angeles
1930s color films
Films directed by Irving Cummings
20th Century Fox films
Films directed by Malcolm St. Clair
Films produced by Darryl F. Zanuck
American comedy-drama films
1939 comedy-drama films
Rin Tin Tin
1930s English-language films
1930s American films
Films set in the 1910s
Films set in the 1920s